The Airscoot was a car made by the Wichita, Kansas-based company Aircraft Products in 1947 to fit the need for a small car that could commute to and from airports then be folded up and put aboard private aircraft. It was able to attain this goal by weighing a mere , and measuring only  in length. Passenger and stowage accommodations included seats for two passengers and a luggage rack in front for two suitcases. Little further information is available on this car.

References

External links
Photo

Veteran vehicles
Defunct motor vehicle manufacturers of the United States
Companies based in Kansas
Vehicle manufacturing companies established in 1947
Vehicle manufacturing companies disestablished in 1947
Defunct companies based in Kansas
1947 establishments in Kansas
1947 disestablishments in Kansas